Olga's Kitchen is an American chain of Greek-American family restaurants located primarily in the Midwestern United States, founded by Olga Loizon. , there were twenty-seven restaurants:  twenty-six in Michigan, and one in Illinois. The first location opened in Birmingham, Michigan in 1970, which is now closed. The company is based in Livonia, Michigan.

History
Olga Loizon founded the first Olga's Kitchen in Birmingham, Michigan in 1970. Loizon developed the chain's recipes in her own basement, using a machine for making souvlaki meat which her uncle had purchased, and sauce inspired by her mother's recipes for yogurt. Throughout the 1970s and 1980s, the chain expanded through southeastern Michigan and into Illinois. The first one in Florida opened at Clearwater Mall in Clearwater, Florida in 1981. For most of the chain's early history, one of its signature items was "Olga Bread", a handmade type of bread used on all of the chain's sandwiches, which themselves are called "Olgas". By 1985, the chain had garnered over $22 million in revenue and had begun franchising. By 1992, the chain had 56 stores in 11 states, and had opened a prototype store at Lakeside Mall in Sterling Heights. This number had shrunk by 1999 to 28 stores in four states, although one of the earliest in St. Clair Square in Fairview Heights, Illinois remained open at the time. A 2006 review of the Lansing Mall location in the Lansing State Journal described the chain's signature sandwich, the Original Olga, as "a hearty sandwich that is tasty and quite filling." The sandwich, served on the Olga bread, features broiled beef and lamb, onions, tomatoes, and a yogurt-based sauce called Olga Sauce.

In June 2015 Olga's Kitchen filed for Chapter 11 bankruptcy protection. In the process it closed its one location in the city of Detroit. Loizon died at age 92 in January 2019.

See also
 List of Greek restaurants

References

External links 
Olga's Kitchen

Restaurants in Michigan
Companies based in Troy, Michigan
Greek-American cuisine
Restaurants established in 1970
1970 establishments in Michigan
Companies that filed for Chapter 11 bankruptcy in 2015